In the Night Garden... is a BBC pre-school children's television programme, first broadcast daily on the CBeebies channel, Series 1 was broadcast starting on 19 March 2007 on the Discover and Do and Bedtime Hour  blocks, with series 2 following from 1 September 2008.  In 2010, the BBC confirmed that it would not be commissioning a third series.

Series overview
<onlyinclude>

Episodes

Season 1 (2007 – 2008)

Season 2 (2008 – 2009)

References

 Lists of British children's television series episodes